Eugen Gottlob Klöpfer (10 March 1886 in Talheim, Heilbronn – 3 March 1950 in Wiesbaden) was a German actor.

Early life
Born to Karl Klöpfer and his wife Karoline, née Hörsch, Eugen attended the Realschule ("secondary school") in Heilbronn.  He subsequently attended the Lateinschule (Latin School) in Lauffen and then the Karlsgymnasium in Heilbronn.

Career

Although he started an apprenticeship with a lumber business in Munich, Klöpfer soon discovered that his passion was the theater. He joined the Theatre Association of Munich and performed at various provincial theaters. In 1905 he was cast in his first role in Landshut, afterwards playing in Ingolstadtand Biel. In 1909 he came to the Volkstheater München ("Munich People's Theater).  From 1914 to 1918, he performed in Colmar, Erfurt, Bonn and Frankfurt am Main.

After the First World War, Klöpfer relocated to Berlin. There he played from 1920 to 1923 at the Deutsches Theater , then at various stages, starting in 1925 in Vienna and Salzburg. Finally, he toured Europe and South America. He played the title role in Carl Zuckmayer's 1927 play Schinderhannes. In the twenties, he appeared in numerous silent films.

Nazi era

After the Nazi seizure of power, he was promoted to the Presiding Board of the Reich Film Chamber, under Joseph Goebbels, and was also chairman of Goebbels' artist donation.  In 1934, Klöpfer was designated as a Staatsschauspieler (i.e. an actor of national importance). He was also appointed the director of the Volksbühne ("People's Theatre")  in Berlin.  From 1935 he was appointed Vice President of the Ministry of Arts and joined the board of UFA. In 1936 he was appointed general director of Berlin's Theater am Nollendorfplatz. In 1937, Klöpfer joined the Nazi Party. In 1940, he played the role of Landschaftskonsulenten Sturm in Veit Harlan's anti-Semitic Nazi propaganda film Jud Süß. In August 1944, towards the end of the Second World War, Klöpfer was added by Adolf Hitler to the Gottbegnadeten-Liste, a list of important German artists, which exempted him from military service, including service on the home front.

Postwar
After 1945, Klöpfer was banned and spent two months in prison in 1948.  After a denazification trial, he was exonerated from the charge of complicity in the death of Joachim Gottschalk. In 1949, he began performing again with his own ensemble in Cologne and Neustadt in der Pfalz, but he died in 1950 of pneumonia. His grave is located in the South Cemetery in Wiesbaden.

Filmography

References 

1886 births
1950 deaths
People from Heilbronn (district)
People from the Kingdom of Württemberg
Nazi Party members
German male silent film actors
German male stage actors
Germany articles needing attention
20th-century German male actors